Socaire is a village located  southeast of the town of San Pedro de Atacama, in the San Pedro de Atacama province of Chile's northern Antofagasta Region. It offers views overlooking the Salar de Atacama.

The local economy is dominated by agriculture and non-metallic mining. Ancient agricultural terraces are part of the landscape of the area.

See also
Atacama Desert
Laguna Miscanti
Chiliques
Laguna Lejía

References
Sernatur - Socaire

Oases of Chile
Populated places in El Loa Province
Climbing areas of Chile